Mount Dulang-dulang, dubbed by Filipino mountaineers as "D2" and also known as Mount Katanglad, is the highest elevation peak in the Kitanglad Mountain Range, located in the north central portion of the province of Bukidnon in the island of Mindanao.

The mountain is regarded by the Talaandig tribe of Lantapan as a sacred place. It is also within the ancestral domain of the tribe. The mountain range is the ancestral home of the Bukidnon, Higaonon, and Talaandig indigenous peoples.

Geography

Mount Dulang-dulang, similar to other peaks located in the Kitanglad Mountain Range, is covered by lofty forests and is a home to a variety of fauna and flora. It is home to 58 mammal species, including bats, squirrels, monkeys, wild boars, flying lemurs, shrews, and deer. 

The Philippine eagle is also sighted within the vicinity of the mountain. At least 58 families and 185 species of trees and other woody vegetation species are found within Mount Kitanglad Range Natural Park.

Hydrological features
Mount Dulang-dulang, including the Kitanglad Mountain Range, is the headwater catchment area of several major river systems which include the Maagnao River and Alanib River, tributaries of the Pulangi River, which drains into the Rio Grande de Mindanao in Cotabato City.

The Sawaga River main is main water of the Bukidnon people for homes and agriculture.

See also
 List of volcanoes in the Philippines
 List of Southeast Asian mountains

Notes

References

External links

 "Mount Dulang-dulang – Climbing, Hiking & Mountaineering" on Mountain-Forecast
 Birdwatching on Mt Dulang-dulang

Mountains of the Philippines
Volcanoes of Mindanao
Landforms of Bukidnon